Tailevu North F.C. also known as Northland Tailevu is a Fijian football team playing in the second division of the Fiji Football Association competitions. It is based in Korovou, which is a situated on the northern side of the island of Viti Levu, some 35 kilometers from Suva.

Their uniform includes green and white.

History 
The Tailevu North Soccer Association was formed in 1957, under the presidency of Kunji Raman.

See also 
 Fiji Football Association

References

Bibliography 
 M. Prasad, Sixty Years of Soccer in Fiji 1938–1998: The Official History of the Fiji Football Association, Fiji Football Association, Suva, 1998.

Football clubs in Fiji
1957 establishments in Fiji